Veronica catenata, the pink water speedwell, is a species of flowering plant in the family Plantaginaceae. It is native to Canada, the United States, Europe, the Azores, and northern Africa. As its common name implies, it prefers growing in or near marshes, rivers, lakes and ponds.

Subtaxa
The following subspecies are accepted:
Veronica catenata subsp. catenata
Veronica catenata subsp. pseudocatenata  – Libya, Egypt

References

catenata
Flora of Western Canada
Flora of Ontario
Flora of Quebec
Flora of the Northwestern United States
Flora of California
Flora of Nevada
Flora of the North-Central United States
Flora of the Northeastern United States
Flora of the South-Central United States
Flora of Kentucky
Flora of Tennessee
Flora of Virginia
Flora of Europe
Flora of the North Caucasus
Flora of the Azores
Flora of North Africa
Plants described in 1921
Flora without expected TNC conservation status